Quiet Storm is the second studio album released by Egyptian trance music duo Aly & Fila after their first album Rising Sun which was released in 2010.

The album comprises 16 tracks, including "Running Out of Time" featuring British singer Chris Jones, which was the first track to be released. The whole album was released on 28 June 2013.

Track listing

Album and tour 
The album took them three years in the making and features collaborations with other producers such as John O'Callaghan and Giuseppe Ottaviani and vocalists such as Sue McLaren, Susana, Chris Jones, Jaren and others.

A six-city tour in support of the release of Quiet Storm started on 6 June at Lima Lounge in Washington D.C. and included a stop at the Lizard Lounge in Dallas. Other events took place on 25 October at Esscala Nights in New York City and on 13 November at the Effex Nightclub in Albuquerque.

Remixes album 
On 18 April 2014, Aly & Fila released Quiet Storm Remixes, including 26 tracks with song remixes by different producers, such as John O'Callaghan, Bryan Kearney and Heatbeat among others.

Charts

References

External links 
 Armada Music
 

Trance albums
2013 albums
Armada Music albums